Gomia Assembly constituency   is an assembly constituency in  the Indian state of Jharkhand.

Members of Assembly

See also
Vidhan Sabha
List of states of India by type of legislature
Jharkhand Legislative Assembly

References

Assembly constituencies of Jharkhand